Fritz Klatt (22 May 1888 – 26 July 1945) was a German educational reformer and writer.

Life

Fritz Klatt was born on 22 May 1888 in Berlin, son of a Sanskrit researcher.
He studied history, pedagogy and philosophy in Berlin.
In the 1920s Klatt was one of the leaders of the German Youth Movement, especially involved in adult education and active leisure.
In 1921 he founded a school in Prerow on the Darß peninsula in Pomerania, which the Nazis closed in 1933.
He thought traditional education overemphasized acquiring knowledge through repetition and obedience.
He advocated "creative education" that would bring out what is already in the man to encourage their individual development.
He attached great importance to community work and leisure activities to reduce stress and regenerate the creative forces.
This included physical activities such as gym, sports and dance.

Klatt wrote Die aufbauende Gemeinschaft  (The Constructive Society), the tenth pamphlet in Hermann Schüller's series Der Aufbau: Flugblätter an Jugend (Constructure: Pamphlets for Youth). He was also one of the contributors to the journal Die Kreatur (The Creature) co-founded in 1925 by Eugen Rosenstock-Huessy and edited by Joseph Wittig, Martin Buber, and Viktor von Weizsäcker, which lasted until 1930.
The journal published writings by authors such as Nikolai Berdyaev, Lev Shestov, Franz Rosenzweig, Ernst Simon, Hugo Bergmann, Hans Ehrenberg and Rudolf Ehrenberg who were opposed to the dominant educational theory in Germany based on idealism, positivism, and historicism.
From 1930 Klatt was co-editor of the Neue Blätter fūr den Socialismus with Eduard Heimann and Paul Tillich.
In 1931 he was appointed professor at the Pedagogical Academy in Altona, Hamburg.

Fritz Klatt died on 28 July 1945 in Vienna.

Selected works

Notes

Sources

1888 births
1945 deaths
German educational theorists
German Youth Movement
Writers from Berlin